Gerb may refer to:

Gerb (pyrotechnic), a standard pyrotechnic device
GERB, a Bulgarian political party
Geostationary Earth Radiation Budget, a satellite instrument
Yarden Gerbi (born 1989), nicknamed "Gerb", Israeli judoka
Gerb, Catalonia, site of an 11th-century castle built by Ermengol IV, Count of Urgell
Gerb, a race in the Star Wars universe